Alexander Hilary Kurtzman (born September 7, 1973) is an American filmmaker. He is best known for his work on the Star Trek franchise since 2009, co-writing the scripts to Transformers (2007), Transformers: Revenge of the Fallen and Star Trek (2009), Star Trek Into Darkness (2013), and The Amazing Spider-Man 2 (2014) with his writing and producing partner Roberto Orci, and directing and co-writing The Mummy (2017). He made his directorial debut with People Like Us (2012), co-written by him, Orci, and Jody Lambert from a story by him. 

Kurtzman is known, alongside Orci, for frequently collaborating with Michael Bay and J.J. Abrams, as well as co-creating the more recent Star Trek shows, including Star Trek: Discovery, Star Trek: Picard, and Star Trek: Strange New Worlds.

Early life, family and education
Kurtzman was born into a Jewish family and raised in Los Angeles, California. His longtime screenwriting partner Roberto Orci was his best friend in high school.

Kurtzman attended Wesleyan University.

Career
Kurtzman first teamed with Orci on the syndicated series Hercules: The Legendary Journeys, for the television unit of Pacific Renaissance Pictures, then operating out of Universal International. After they produced several storylines to cope with the absence of lead actor Kevin Sorbo following a stroke that Sorbo had suffered during the fourth season, Kurtzman and Orci, both aged 24, were placed in charge of the show. They moved into films after they were asked to rewrite Michael Bay's The Island. The film earned nearly $163 million at the worldwide box office, on a budget of $126 million, which was enough of a success that they were brought in to write Bay's Transformers, which earned $710 million. Though The Island, Transformers and Transformers: Revenge of the Fallen were not particularly well received by critics, the three films earned a combined $1.7 billion. They co-created the Fox TV series Fringe in 2008 along with J. J. Abrams. After the pilot, Kurtzman served as consulting producer on the show for the remainder of its run. They then co-wrote the 2009 film Star Trek.

In 2011, Forbes magazine described Orci and Kurtzman as "Hollywood's Secret Weapons" as, over the course of the previous six years, their films had grossed a combined total of over $3 billion at the box office. The partnership also wrote People Like Us, originally known as Welcome to People, which was Kurtzman's theatrical directorial debut.

Kurtzman has frequently worked with a tight-knit group of film professionals which include J. J. Abrams, Damon Lindelof, Adam Horowitz, Roberto Orci, Edward Kitsis, Andre Nemec, Josh Appelbaum, Jeff Pinkner, and Bryan Burk. In April 2014, both Orci and Kurtzman confirmed to Variety that they would no longer work together on film projects; they added that they would still work together—but only on television projects.

In 2018, Kurtzman signed a new five-year deal with CBS Television Studios to oversee and expand the Star Trek franchise on television, including serving as executive producer on Star Trek: Discovery (which he also co-showruns with Michelle Paradise), Star Trek: Short Treks, Star Trek: Picard, and Star Trek: Lower Decks.

In August 2021, Kurtzman and his production company Secret Hideout extended their overall deal with CBS Studios through 2026.

Personal life
In 2002, Kurtzman married Samantha Counter, the daughter of lawyer Nick Counter.

Filmography

Producer only

Television credits

Executive producer only
 Transformers Prime (2010–2013)
 Matador (2014)
 Scorpion (2014–2018)
 Salvation (2017–2018)
 Instinct (2018–2019)
 Star Trek: Lower Decks (2020–present)
 Star Trek: Prodigy (2021)

References

External links

1973 births
21st-century American Jews
Living people
American film directors
American film producers
American male screenwriters
American male television writers
American television directors
American television producers
American television writers
Crossroads School alumni
Film directors from Los Angeles
Film producers from California
Jewish American screenwriters
Screenwriters from California
Showrunners
Television producers from California
Wesleyan University alumni
Writers from Los Angeles